Drew Spence (born 23 October 1992) is an English-born Jamaican professional footballer who plays as a midfielder for FA WSL club Tottenham Hotspur and the Jamaica women's national football team. She played for the England women's national football team in 2015.

Club career
Chelsea and England teammate Gilly Flaherty recalled playing alongside Spence in the Arsenal Centre of Excellence. Spence progressed to Fulham's youth team, before signing for Chelsea in 2008.

Chelsea reached the FA Women's Cup final for the first time in 2012, but were eventually beaten by Birmingham City in a penalty shootout after twice taking the lead in a 2–2 draw. Spence's effort was saved by Becky Spencer.

In 2015 Chelsea won their first ever major trophy, in the 2015 FA Women's Cup Final at Wembley Stadium. They then beat Sunderland 4–0 in October 2015 to secure the FA WSL title and a League and Cup "double". At the end of the season Spence signed a new two-year contract with Chelsea.

During a 5–0 thrashing by Arsenal in October 2018, Spence left Kim Little nursing a broken leg with what Arsenal's website described as a "heavy tackle". The match officials were criticised for failing to send off Spence, who left Little ruled out for around ten weeks.

In 2020 Spence signed a new contract that will see her stay with Chelsea until 2022.

In June 2022, Spence signed a two-year contract with Tottenham Hotspur, leaving Chelsea as their longest serving player.

International career
National coach Mark Sampson gave Spence her first senior call up in October 2015, in an understrength squad for the 2015 Yongchuan International Tournament. She won her first England cap on 23 October 2015, as a substitute in England's 2–1 defeat by China in Yongchuan.

In September 2017, Spence's Chelsea team-mate Eniola Aluko was pursuing allegations of racial discrimination against The FA through the pages of The Guardian newspaper. Spence was drawn into the controversy when she was revealed as the previously-anonymous "The Player" who was said to have been "upset and offended" by Mark Sampson on the trip to China.

Spence also qualifies for Jamaica through her heritage and gets her first call-up to Reggae Girlz for June international break camp. She made her debut on 24 October 2021.

Personal life
Spence's brother Lewwis Spence is also a professional footballer.

Honours 
Chelsea Women

 FA Women's Super League (5): 2015, 2017–18, 2019–20, 2020–21, 2021–22
 FA WSL Spring Series (1): 2017
 Women's FA Cup (4): 2014–15, 2017–18, 2020–21, 2021–22
 FA Women's League Cup (2): 2019–20, 2020–21
 Women's FA Community Shield (1): 2020

Individual
 CONCACAF W Championship Best XI: 2022

References

External links

 
 Drew Spence at Chelsea FC
 Drew Spence profile  at the Football Association
Drew Spence news at Chelsea FC

1992 births
Living people
Citizens of Jamaica through descent
Jamaican women's footballers
Women's association football midfielders
Jamaica women's international footballers
Footballers from Greater London
English women's footballers
Arsenal W.F.C. players
Fulham L.F.C. players
Chelsea F.C. Women players
Tottenham Hotspur F.C. Women players
FA Women's National League players
Women's Super League players
England women's under-23 international footballers
England women's international footballers
English sportspeople of Jamaican descent
Black British sportswomen